Blue Mound Township, Illinois refers to one of the following places:

 Blue Mound Township, Macon County, Illinois
 Blue Mound Township, McLean County, Illinois

See also

Blue Mound Township (disambiguation)

Illinois township disambiguation pages